Vaitiare Eugenia Hirshon (born August 15, 1964), previously known as Vaitiare Bandera and Vaitiare Hirshon-Asars, is an American actress best known for her appearances in Stargate SG-1.

Career 

Vaitiare was a spokesperson for Miller Beer from 1993 through to 1995. She has also done ads for McDonald's, Cox Communications, JCPenney, Toyota, Coors Dry, Caroche Jeans in Spain and Honda in Tahiti. She starred in the Spanish-language telenovella , which was seen in 45 countries. She also made guest appearances in Married... with Children, Out of the Blue and Acapulco H.E.A.T.. She also had a role in the movie U.S. Marshals. Vaitiare's best known role was in Stargate SG-1, where she guest starred in several episodes as Daniel Jackson's wife, Sha're.

She originally auditioned for the role of Sha're in Stargate, the 1994 film, but ultimately lost to Mili Avital. She was offered the role in the following television series Stargate SG-1 after auditioning again for the same part.

Personal life 
Vaitiare Hirshon was born in Tahiti, French Polynesia and grew up in Southern California. She is of Tahitian, Cook Islander, English, French and German-Jewish descent. Her mother is related to the Royal House of Makea Karika Ariki in the Cook Islands. She is also related to Thomas Robert Alexander Harries Davis, who was the 4th prime minister of the Cook Islands. Her grandfather, Lewis Hirshon, was a stockbroker from New York.  She has claimed that her grandfather's house in Tahiti was where the Pulitzer Prize-winning author, James A. Michener, wrote Return to Paradise.

In 1982 and 1990, she was a young model and girlfriend of Julio Iglesias, after which she married director Peter Bandera, in 1994-97. Following that, she had a relationship with Michael Shanks, after meeting him while working together on Stargate SG-1, in 1998. She and Shanks had a daughter together: Tatiana. This relationship ended in 2000. In 2004, she married Edgar Asars and had a son. They divorced in 2016.

She currently lives in Los Angeles, California with her daughter and son. She ran three fashion companies.

She's executive producer of the award-winning short film Far Away Places, which her daughter wrote and directed at the age of 18, bringing awareness to child sex abuse.

Filmography 

This is a partial listing of series/movies which this actress has been in. She is sometimes credited as Vaitiare Hirshon or Vaitiaré.

References

External links
 
 
 Vaitiare, Espectacular a Los 54 años at ALGENTE
 Vaitiare: "Miranda y yo podemos ser amigas" at Vanity Fair España
  Originally published by Titan Magazines.

American film actresses
American television actresses
French Polynesian emigrants to the United States
1964 births
Living people
French Polynesian actresses
20th-century American actresses
American people of English descent
American people of French descent
American people of Jewish descent
American people of German-Jewish descent
American people of New Zealand descent
20th-century French women
21st-century American women